Sunway Carnival Mall is a shopping mall located at Seberang Jaya, Central Seberang Perai, Penang, Malaysia.

The  four-story mall opened in June 2007. It is located beside the Sunway Hotel within the town center of Seberang Jaya, a township initiated by the Government to boost the administrative, residential, industrial and commercial sector of Malaysia's northern region.

Parkson Departmental Store, Golden Screen Cinemas, Jaya Grocer and NOKO Store are the anchor tenants.  It also contains over 350 specialty stores.

See also 
Sunway City
Sunway Pyramid

References

2007 establishments in Malaysia
Central Seberang Perai District
Shopping malls in Penang
Sunway Group